McCormick Taylor, Inc. (formerly known as McCormick Taylor & Associates, Inc., or MTA) is a professional consulting firm based in Philadelphia. 

The firm employs more than 500 professionals in 20 offices, and specializes in energy services, water resources, civil design, planning, environmental studies, and communications for transportation development projects. The firm's clients include  state departments of transportation (DOTs), metropolitan planning organizations (MPOs), turnpike authorities, counties, municipalities, and energy/utility companies.

History
The firm was established in 1946 by Thomas J. McCormick, P.E., an engineer and professor in Philadelphia. He was joined by Paul G. Taylor in the early 1950s. Together, they formed McCormick Taylor & Associates. 

In the 1970s, the firm shifted focus toward transportation planning and design, and began employing a multi-disciplinary approach to projects. The result was that McCormick Taylor emerged in the 1980s as a full-service consulting engineering and environmental planning firm  focused on transportation projects.

The firm changed its name to McCormick Taylor, Inc. in 2004, resulting in a new logo.

In 2011, James C. Wiggans, P.E. and Patrick J. Guise, ventured into partnership. From 2014-2015, the firm grew from 12 offices to 20, and ventured into four new states—Arizona, North Carolina, South Carolina, and most recently, Florida. 

Since 2011, the company has increased its technical staff levels by nearly 20 percent. McCormick Taylor also expanded into new markets, growing from predominantly transportation-related work for the public sector to permitting and environmental monitoring activities for private energy and utility companies.

References

Construction and civil engineering companies of the United States